Syngas, or synthesis gas, is a mixture of hydrogen and carbon monoxide, in various ratios.  The gas often contains some carbon dioxide and methane.   It is principally used for producing ammonia or methanol. Syngas is combustible and can be used as a fuel. Historically, it has been used as a replacement for gasoline, when gasoline supply has been limited; for example, wood gas was used to power cars in Europe during WWII (in Germany alone half a million cars were built or rebuilt to run on wood gas).

Production
Syngas is produced by steam reforming or partial oxidation of natural gas or liquid hydrocarbons, or coal gasification. Steam reforming of methane is an endothermic reaction requiring 206 kJ/mol of methane:

In principle, but rarely in practice, biomass and related hydrocarbon feedstocks could be used to generate biogas and biochar in waste-to-energy gasification facilities. The gas generated (mostly methane and carbon dioxide) is sometimes described as syngas but its composition differs from syngas. Generation of conventional syngas (mostly H2 and CO) from waste biomass has been explored.

Composition, pathway for formation, and thermochemistry
The chemical composition of syngas varies based on the raw materials and the processes. Syngas produced by coal gasification generally is a mixture of 30 to 60% carbon monoxide, 25 to 30% hydrogen, 5 to 15% carbon dioxide, and 0 to 5% methane. It also contains lesser amount of other gases. Syngas has less than half the energy density of natural gas.

The first reaction, between incandescent coke and steam, is strongly endothermic, producing carbon monoxide (CO), and hydrogen  (water gas in older terminology). When the coke bed has cooled to a temperature at which the endothermic reaction can no longer proceed, the steam is then replaced by a blast of air.

The second and third reactions then take place, producing an exothermic reaction—forming initially carbon dioxide and raising the temperature of the coke bed—followed by the second endothermic reaction, in which the latter is converted to carbon monoxide. The overall reaction is exothermic, forming "producer gas" (older terminology). Steam can then be re-injected, then air etc., to give an endless series of cycles until the coke is finally consumed.  Producer gas has a much lower energy value, relative to water gas, due primarily to dilution with atmospheric nitrogen.  Pure oxygen can be substituted for air to avoid the dilution effect, producing gas of much higher calorific value.
 
In order to produce more hydrogen from this mixture, more steam is added and the water gas shift reaction is carried out:

A variety of alternative technologies have been investigated, but none are of commercial value. Some variations focus on new stoichiometries such as carbon dioxide plus methane or partial hydrogenation of carbon dioxide. Other research focuses on novel energy sources to drive the processes including electrolysis, solar energy, microwaves, and electric arcs.

Electricity generated from renewable sources is also used to process carbon dioxide and water into syngas through high-temperature electrolysis. This is an attempt to maintain carbon neutrality in the generation process. Audi, in partnership with company named Sunfire, opened a pilot plant in November 2014 to generate e-diesel using this process.

Syngas that is not methanized typically has a lower heating value of 120 BTU/scf . Untreated syngas can be run in hybrid turbines that allow for greater efficiency because of their lower operating temperatures, and extended part lifetime.

Uses
Syngas is used as a source of hydrogen as well as a fuel. it is also used to directly reduce iron ore to sponge iron.  Chemical uses include the production of methanol which is a precursor to acetic acid and many acetates; liquid fuels and lubricants via the Fischer–Tropsch process and previously the Mobil methanol to gasoline process; ammonia via the Haber process, which converts atmospheric nitrogen (N2) into ammonia which is used as a fertilizer; and oxo alcohols via an intermediate aldehyde.

See also 

Boudouard reaction
Claus process
Coal gas
Industrial gas
Integrated gasification combined cycle
Partial oxidation
Reformer sponge iron cycle
Syngas fermentation
Underground coal gasification

References

External links
"Sewage treatment plant smells success in synthetic gas trial" ARENA, accessed December 6 2020
Fischer Tropsch archive
https://www.technologyreview.com/s/508051/a-cheap-trick-enables-energy-efficient-carbon-capture/

Coal technology
Fuel gas
Waste treatment technology
Synthetic fuels
Industrial gases
Synthetic fuel technologies
Petrochemicals